The men's 4 × 100 metres relay event at the 2016 IAAF World U20 Championships was held at Zdzisław Krzyszkowiak Stadium on 23 and 24 July.

Medalists

*Athletes who competed in heats only

Records

Results

Heats
Qualification: First 3 of each heat (Q) plus the 2 fastest times (q) qualified for the final.

Final

References

4 x 400 metres relay
Relays at the World Athletics U20 Championships